Dorothea "Dodo" Chaplet is a fictional character played by Jackie Lane in the long-running British science fiction television series Doctor Who. An Earth teenager from the year 1966, she was a companion of the First Doctor and a regular in the programme in its third season, from February to July 1966. Only three of the serials in which Dodo appeared as a regular are complete in the BBC archive (The Ark, The Gunfighters and The War Machines). Dodo's personality was an unsophisticated, bright and happy one.

Lane's contract was not extended beyond episode two of The War Machines. To replace her, two new characters, Polly (Anneke Wills) and Ben (Michael Craze), the new faces of Doctor Who in the "swinging" mid-1960s, became companions. Dodo appeared in six stories (19 episodes, of which 11 currently exist in the BBC Archives).

Dodo has appeared in several spin-off productions, including Big Finish audio dramas and novels, all without the involvement of Lane.

Appearances

Television
Dodo is introduced at the end of the serial The Massacre of St Bartholomew's Eve. In that story, the Doctor and Steven travel to 1572 Paris, where they witness the persecution of the city's Huguenot population. Despite befriending a young woman named Anne Chaplet, the Doctor knows he cannot prevent the coming massacre of 10,000 Huguenots, including Anne, by the Catholic French authorities. He therefore leaves in the TARDIS, taking Steven with him. When Steven finds out, he is furious and considers leaving the Doctor while the TARDIS is in 1960s London.

Steven returns at the same time that a young woman wanders into the TARDIS thinking it was a real police box. The Doctor and Steven are taken aback when she introduces herself as Dodo Chaplet and reveals that her grandfather was French. The Doctor speculates that Dodo might be Anne's descendant.

At the end of The Massacre of St Bartholomew's Eve she reveals she has no parents, explaining that she lives with her great-aunt "and she won't care if she never sees me again". She witnesses images of herself on the Celestial Toymaker's memory window from the day her mother died.

In her travels with the Doctor, Dodo travels to the far future, unfortunately bringing the common cold with her to infect humanity's descendants; faces the mad games of the Celestial Toymaker; witnesses the gunfight at the O.K. Corral; says goodbye to Steven in The Savages; and is hypnotised by the rogue artificial intelligence WOTAN in The War Machines.

Halfway through that last adventure, she abruptly departs for a rest in the country after being hypnotised, and never reappears. At the story's conclusion, Polly (who, with Ben Jackson, took Dodo's place as a companion) explains to the departing Doctor that Dodo has decided to remain in the 20th century.

Webcast
In the 2020 webcast Farewell, Sarah Jane, written by Russell T Davies, Dodo is mentioned as being present at the funeral of Sarah Jane Smith. For Dodo to survive into the 21st century would contradict the varying accounts of her death (see below).

Other media
Dodo's life prior to joining the Doctor and the circumstances under which she joined him in the TARDIS were elaborated on in the Past Doctor Adventures novel Salvation, in which the TARDIS, departing after she has entered it, travels to New York City in Dodo's present, resulting in Dodo working with the Doctor and Steven to investigate mysterious beings who appear to be gods. In the Virgin Missing Adventures novel The Man in the Velvet Mask, Dodo has sex and is infected with an alien virus which slowly corrupts her.

Dodo's life after she left the Doctor was not dealt with in the programme. The spin-off novel Who Killed Kennedy by David Bishop reveals that Dodo suffered a nervous breakdown and was unable to remember her adventures with the Doctor, drifting in and out of psychiatric institutions. Becoming involved with a journalist who was investigating the truth behind UNIT, Dodo is murdered by a pawn of the Master. Her funeral is attended only by her lover James Stevens and an unidentified man who, based on the limited description provided, may be either the Second or Seventh Doctor. However, in the 20th-anniversary version of the novel, a new timeline is created where the assassin is stopped by her lover when he travels back in time from the future after an intervention by the Doctor, implied to be the Twelfth such incarnation. James Stevens passes away in 2015, by which time Dodo is also deceased. However, the canonicity of the novels in relation to the television series is open to question. She is revealed to be alive and well in the 2020 The Sarah Jane Adventures audio special Goodbye Sarah Jane Smith, where she attends Sarah Jane's funeral and helps defeat a race of aliens who have infiltrated the service.

Dodo also appears in the Past Doctor Adventures novel Bunker Soldiers, four short stories in the Virgin Decalog and BBC Short Trips, and the Big Finish Productions audio dramas Mother Russia, Tales from the Vault, Return of the Rocket Men, and The War to End All Wars (which reveals that Steven named his favorite daughter after Dodo, although she died in an attempted coup caused by her sisters), and as a solo companion in Big Finish Short Trip The Horror at Bletchington Station.

Conception and casting
Dodo was originally intended to have a "common" accent, and is portrayed this way at the end of The Massacre. However, starting with the next story, The Ark, it was declared that Doctor Who regulars were required to speak in "BBC English", and so Dodo's accent was changed. In The Horror at Bletchington Station, narrator Stephen Critchlow provides her with a Birmingham accent very different from either of her previous dialects.

Reception
Ultimately the character was not deemed a success by the programme's makers, and has not been reappraised by critics or fans. One fan wrote "Dodo was a transitionary companion, in existence to fill console room space between a producer who didn’t know what to do with her and a producer who wanted nothing to do with her ... it didn’t matter that Dodo doesn’t work; she was a ticked box, a signed contract ... Dodo made sure existing scripts could be used with minimal rewrites, that the BBC machine could continue to churn out 45 episodes per annuum, without pausing to think, plan or contemplate". The same editorial compares her negatively to Ben and Polly, saying "the moment [they] arrive, the character’s flaws become clear".

Lane never returned to the role, only reconnecting with the franchise to wish fans well during 50th anniversary celebrations. In a 1988 interview with Doctor Who Magazine, she said "…[Innes Lloyd, then-producer of Doctor Who] had definite plans for the series which neither Steven nor Dodo really fitted, and half way through my first year I was told that Dodo was to be written out. I would have liked a dramatic ending and my farewell just two episodes into The War Machines, and not even on camera but in reported speech, was a bit of an anti-climax. Still, I got my revenge. I now run a voice-over agency and Innes Lloyd once asked me to find him work. I reminded him that he had once sacked me from Doctor Who and said a very firm ‘no’!"

References

Bibliography
 James Chapman, Inside the Tardis: the worlds of Doctor Who: a cultural history, I.B.Tauris, 2006, 
 R. H. Langley, The Doctor Who error finder: plot, continuity, and production mistakes in the television series and films, McFarland & Co., 2005, 
 John Kenneth Muir, A critical history of Doctor Who on television, McFarland & Co., 1999,

External links

 Dodo Chaplet on the BBC's Doctor Who website

Television characters introduced in 1966
Doctor Who companions
Female characters in television
Fictional people from London
Orphan characters in television